The Fascist Union of Youth (Soyuz Fashistskoy Molodyozhi) was the youth organization of the Russian Fascist Party. It was founded in 1936 in Harbin, Manchukuo, which consisted of all automatic members of the organizations VFP from ages 16 to 25.

Ideology and tactics of the Union is entirely determined by ideology and tactics of the Russian Fascist Party. 
Admission to the Union was carried out automatically: all members of the organization VFP appropriate age, regardless of gender. Members of the Union remained part of the VFP.
 
The Union was divided into two groups, Junior and Senior, each of which had two levels, Second Level (Young Fascist) and First Level (Avangardisty). Members had to pass certain exams to advance to a higher level. Those who successfully passed to the second stage of the Union were enrolled in the Stolypin Fascist Academy.
 
The Union had cultural, educational, dramatic and philosophical circles, as well as sewing and language schools. The military and political sections were the most important ones in the Union. Structural units of the Union were branches of the Department of the VFP. The head of the Union was appointed by the Head of the VFP and the remaining leaders were appointed by the head of the Union.

References

Sources
 The Russian Fascists: Tragedy and Farce in Exile, 1925-1945 by John J. Stephan 
 К. В. Родзаевский. Завещание Русского фашиста. М., ФЭРИ-В, 2001 
 А. В. Окороков. Фашизм и русская эмиграция (1920-1945 гг.). — М.: Руссаки, 2002. — 593 с. —

External links
Russian Fascist Party 
Русские фашисты в Китае 

Anti-communist organizations
Politics of the Soviet Union
Russian nationalist organizations
Fascism in Manchukuo
Youth organizations established in 1936
Youth wings of fascist parties